The Bruce Weiner Microcar Museum was a museum in Madison, Georgia, United States, that held a large collection of microcars. The museum was created by Bruce Weiner, an executive of Dubble Bubble, who collected microcars as a hobby.

The entire collection was auctioned off February 15–16, 2013. The top selling price was for Lot 603, a 1958 F.M.R. Tg 500 'Tiger' that sold for $322,000.

References

External links
The Bruce Weiner Microcar Museum

Defunct museums in Georgia (U.S. state)
Automobile museums in the United States
Museums disestablished in 2013
Museums established in 1997